Barion Brown (born December 12, 2003) is an American football wide receiver for the Kentucky Wildcats.

Early life and high school
Brown grew up in Nashville, Tennessee and attended Pearl-Cohn Comprehensive High School. As a senior, he rushed for 897 yards and 10 touchdowns on 59 carries and also caught 22 passes for 303 yards and three touchdowns. At the end of the season, Brown was named the Tennessee Titans Class 4A Mr. Football. He also ran track at Pearl-Cohn and won state championships in the 100-meter and 200-meter dash as a junior and as a senior. Brown committed to play college football at Kentucky after considering offers from Alabama, TCU, and Ole Miss. He was the highest-rated receiver to sign with the school.

College career
Brown entered his freshman season at Kentucky as the Wildcats' primary kick returner. He returned a kickoff 100 yards for a touchdown in his college debut against Miami of Ohio and was later named the Southeastern Conference (SEC) Special Teams Player of the Week. Brown was also named the SEC co-Freshman of the Week for weeks 4 and 5.

References

External links
Kentucky Wildcats bio

Living people
Players of American football from Tennessee
American football wide receivers
Kentucky Wildcats football players
2003 births